William Donald Nyrop (July 23, 1952 – December 31, 1995) was a professional ice hockey player who won three Stanley Cups with the Montreal Canadiens in 1976, 1977, and 1978.

Early life
Nyrop was born in Washington, D.C., and his father, Donald Nyrop, served as U.S. Administrator of Civil Aeronautics (now the Federal Aviation Administration) and Chairman of the U.S. Civil Aeronautics Board (now National Transportation Safety Board) under President Harry S. Truman in the early 1950s. Donald Nyrop moved his family to Edina, Minnesota, where he served as president, CEO and chairman of the board of Northwest Airlines from 1954–1976. As a boy, Nyrop attended Edina High School, where he was an all-star athlete, playing quarterback for an undefeated football team and leading the hockey team to the state title in 1969.

After graduation from high school in 1970, Nyrop attended the University of Notre Dame. He tried out for the Notre Dame football team in 1971 and won a spot on the roster as the backup quarterback. However, he was injured in practice and never played for the team, instead playing hockey during his four years in college. After his sophomore year with the Fighting Irish in 1971–72, Nyrop was selected 66th overall by the Montreal Canadiens at the 1972 NHL Amateur Draft. He attended his first pro training camp in September 1972, and in 1973 he was voted on to the WCHA first all-star team and the NCAA west first all-American team. The next year, he represented the United States at the "B" Pool Ice Hockey World Championship where he was named to the tournament All-Star team as the best defenseman.

Pro career
During his first pro season with the American Hockey League's Nova Scotia Voyageurs in 1974–75, Nyrop played with the stability of a seasoned veteran. He made his National Hockey League (NHL) debut the next year on February 22, 1976 with the Montreal Canadiens, dressing for 19 games and became a regular on defense in the playoffs as the Canadiens won the Stanley Cup. Later that year Nyrop scored two points in five games and was stalwart on the defense as team captain for the United States team at the inaugural 1976 Canada Cup. Nyrop spent two years on the Montreal defense and helped the team win the Stanley Cup in 1977 and 1978. After the 1977–78 season, Nyrop stepped away from the game to study law. His rights were traded by the Canadiens to the Minnesota North Stars in September 1980 and he returned to the NHL a year later. He dressed for 42 regular season games with the Stars and two post-season contests in which his team was upset by Chicago in the first round. Nyrop also played briefly for Kölner Haie of the German league in 1982–83 before retiring for good.

Post career
After retirement, Nyrop attended Gonzaga University School of Law in Spokane, Washington, earning his Juris Doctor (J.D.) in 1986. He set up his law practice, but then returned to hockey as the coach of the Knoxville Cherokees of the East Coast Hockey League (ECHL) in 1991-92. The following season, Nyrop became owner and coach of the Sunshine Hockey League's West Palm Beach Blaze. After guiding the club to three straight league championships, he sold his interest in the club due to failing health. In September 1995, Nyrop was diagnosed with inoperable colon cancer, which had spread to his liver and lungs. He died three months later in his father's home in Minneapolis at age 43.

Career statistics

Regular season and playoffs

International

Awards and honors

Stanley Cup champion in 1976, 1977 and 1978
Member of the 1978 National Hockey League All-Star team
WEC-B All-Star Team in 1974

References

External links
 

1952 births
1995 deaths
AHCA Division I men's ice hockey All-Americans
American men's ice hockey defensemen
Deaths from cancer in Minnesota
Ice hockey players from Minnesota
Sportspeople from Edina, Minnesota
Ice hockey people from Washington, D.C.
Minnesota North Stars players
Montreal Canadiens draft picks
Montreal Canadiens players
Notre Dame Fighting Irish football players
Notre Dame Fighting Irish men's ice hockey players
Stanley Cup champions
United States Hockey Hall of Fame inductees
Edina High School alumni